The German Darts Championship is a Professional Darts Corporation event that takes place in Germany as part of the PDC European Tour. Since 2013, it has been held at Halle 39 in Hildesheim, after previously being held in Berlin and Halle.

Past finals

References

 
Professional Darts Corporation tournaments
International sports competitions hosted by Germany
Recurring sporting events established in 2007
2007 establishments in Germany
Annual sporting events in Germany
PDC European Tour